Stan Davidson (born 26 April 1954) is  a former Australian rules footballer who played with Footscray in the Victorian Football League (VFL).

Notes

External links 		
		
		
		
		
		

1954 births		
Living people	
Australian rules footballers from Victoria (Australia)		
Western Bulldogs players
Sale Football Club players